Klaus von Fersen (born 29 March 1931) is a West German rower who represented the United Team of Germany. He competed at the 1956 Summer Olympics in Melbourne with the men's single sculls where he was eliminated in the semi-final.

References

1931 births
Living people
West German male rowers
Olympic rowers of the United Team of Germany
Rowers at the 1956 Summer Olympics
European Rowing Championships medalists